Presidential elections were planned to be held in Iceland on 28 June 2008. 

The incumbent president Ólafur Ragnar Grímsson, first elected in 1996, stated in his New Year's speech that he would contest the election for a fourth term. 

Ástþór Magnússon, who ran unsuccessfully in 1996 and 2004, ruled out a candidacy. 

No challenger to the incumbent president filed by the deadline to declare a candidacy on 24 May 2008, and so Ólafur Ragnar's fourth term was won uncontested. 

Ólafur Ragnar was sworn in on 1 August 2008.

References

Presidential elections in Iceland
Presidential election
Iceland
Uncontested elections
Iceland